Sadhanwas is a village of Sub-division Jakhal in Fatehabad district in the state of Haryana, India. It is located 46 km towards East from District headquarters Fatehabad, 6 km from Jakhal Mandi, and 166 km from Chandigarh.

Demographies
As per the Census 2011, the literacy rate of Sadhanwas is 64.1% . Thus Sadhanwas village has higher literacy rate compared to 59.2% of Fatehabad district. The male literacy rate is 70.06% and the female literacy rate is 57.82%.

References

Villages in Fatehabad district